Color Him Wild (also released as Dues) is an album released by Canadian jazz trumpeter Maynard Ferguson featuring tracks recorded in 1964 and originally released on the Mainstream label.

Reception

Allmusic awarded the album 3 stars calling it an excellent album and states "The band's sound and winning spirit were still unchanged from its prime days".

Track listing
 "Airegin (Sonny Rollins) - 4:20  
 "Macarena" (Bernardino Monterde) - 3:28  
 "Green Dolphin Street" (Bronisław Kaper) - 4:00  
 "People" (Bob Merrill, Jule Styne) - 2:44  
 "This Night" (Ralph Rainger, Leo Robin) - 4:45  
 "The Lady's in Love" (Warren Noble) - 2:37  
 "Tinsel" (Willie Maiden) - 6:25  
 "Three More Foxes" (Maiden) - 6:00  
 "Come Rain or Come Shine" (Johnny Mercer, Harold Arlen) - 5:00

Personnel 
Maynard Ferguson, Nat Pavone, Don Rader, Harry Hall, Dick Hurwitz - trumpet
Kenny Rupp - trombone, tuba
Rob McConnell - valve trombone
Ronnie Cuber - baritone saxophone
Willie Maiden, Frank Vicari - tenor saxophone, clarinet
Lanny Morgan - alto saxophone, clarinet, flute
Mike Abene - piano
Ronnie McClure - bass  
Tony Inzalaco - drums

References 

1965 albums
Maynard Ferguson albums
Mainstream Records albums